This list of earth sciences awards is an index to articles on notable awards for earth sciences, or natural science related to the planet Earth. It includes awards for meteorology, oceanography and paleontology, but excludes awards for environmental science, geography, geology and geophysics, which are covered by separate lists.

General

Meteorology

Oceanography

Paleontology

See also

 Lists of awards
 List of environmental awards
 List of geography awards
 List of geology awards 
 List of geophysics awards

References

 
Earth sciences